Coccothrinax scoparia is a palm which is endemic to Hispaniola.

Henderson and colleagues (1995) considered C. scoparia to be a synonym of Coccothrinax miraguama.

References

scoparia
Trees of Haiti
Trees of the Dominican Republic 
Plants described in 1908
Taxa named by Odoardo Beccari